Reinerite is a rare arsenite (arsenate(III)) mineral with chemical formula Zn3(AsO3)2. It crystallizes in the orthorhombic crystal system.

Physical properties
Reinerite is most commonly found as a sky blue colored mineral, however, it may also be a light yellowish green color. Reinerite has a relative hardness of 5 to 5.5 on the Mohs Scale which is equivalent to that of a knife blade and or shard of glass. It has a density of 4.27 g/cm3, and it exhibits a nonmetallic luster that may be described as glassy or vitreous.

Environment
Reinerite develops in dolomite-hosted locations. It is known especially from Namibia, Africa, within the mines of Tsumeb. It occurs in association with chalcocite, bornite, willemite, smithsonite, hydrozincite, hemimorphite, adamite, olivenite and gebhardite.

History
Reinerite was first described in 1958 for an occurrence in the Tsumeb Mine, Tsumeb, Namibia and named for senior chemist Willy Reiner (1895–1965) of Tsumeb Corporation, who analyzed this mineral.

References

Arsenic minerals
Zinc minerals
Orthorhombic minerals
Minerals in space group 55
Minerals described in 1958